Tatyana Ponomaryova (born 23 February 1988) is a Kazakhstani female water polo player. She was a member of the Kazakhstan women's national water polo team. 

She was a part of the team at the World Championships, most recently at the 2007 World Aquatics Championships.

References 

Living people

1988 births
Kazakhstani female water polo players